Zgornji Pokštajn (also Zgornji Pokštanj) is a former village in the Municipality of Kočevje in southern Slovenia. The area is part of the traditional region of Lower Carniola and is now included in the Southeast Slovenia Statistical Region. Its territory is now part of the village of Podlesje.

History
Together with Verdreng, Spodnji Pokštajn, and Lapinje, it was merged into the settlement of Podlesje in 1955.

References

External links
(Zgornji) Pokštajn on Geopedia
Pre–World War II map of Zgornji Pokštajn with oeconyms and family names

Former populated places in the Municipality of Kočevje
Populated places disestablished in 1955
1955 disestablishments in Slovenia